The ANIMATOR International Animated Film Festival (Polish: Międzynarodowy Festiwal Filmów Animowanych ANIMATOR), organized in Poznań under the patronage of the city of Poznań since 2008, is the most important international animated film festival in Poland. During every edition of this event more than 500 films from all over the world, including retrospectives, thematic reviews, premieres and screenings with live music and rarely shown works of animation pioneers are presented.

The festival reviews are accompanied by the International Short and Full-length Animated Film Competition, judged by an international jury, for which films from more than fifty countries are entered. The grand prize awarded at this competition is the Golden Pegasus (Polish: "Złoty Pegaz").

The activities of the Animator Festival include meetings with artists, exhibitions, performances, concerts, workshops and lectures. A distinguishing feature of the ANIMATOR Festival is its focusing on the interrelations between animation and music. Many screenings are accompanied by live music, performed by a jazz trio, rock band, DJ collective or symphonic orchestra.

The programme of every edition of the festival is characterized by a broad thematic, cultural and historical diversity. Along with the most recent works representing various techniques and modern trends in animation cinema, the rich history and prehistory of the world cinema is presented at the festival.

The festival’s artistic director is Marcin Giżycki.

Competition categories and prizes

Editions of the festival 
1st International Animated Film Festival: 07-12 July 2008 http://www.animator-festival.com/2008/index.php?lang=EN
2nd International Animated Film Festival: 06-11 July 2009 http://www.animator-festival.com/2009/index.php?lang=EN
3rd International Animated Film Festival: 12–17 July 2010 http://www.animator-festival.com/2010/index.php?lang=EN
4th International Animated Film Festival: 15–21 July 2011 http://www.animator-festival.com/2011/index.php?lang=EN
5th International Animated Film Festival: 13–19 July 2012 http://www.animator-festival.com/2012/index.php?lang=EN
6th International Animated Film Festival: planned for 13–19 July 2013

External links 
Official website: https://web.archive.org/web/20130412025729/http://www.animator-festival.com/

Animation film festivals
Film festivals in Poland
Poznań